Kirsten Bakis (born 1968 Switzerland) is an American novelist.

Biography
Bakis was raised in Westchester County, New York, and graduated from New York University in 1990.  She is a recipient of a Teaching/Writing Fellowship from the University of Iowa Writer's Workshop, a grant from the Michener/Copernicus Society of America.

She published her first novel, Lives of the Monster Dogs, in 1997. In 2017, the novel was reissued.

She has taught at Hampshire College and was a writer-in-residence at Skidmore College, Saratoga Springs, New York in 2005.  She is currently living in Croton-on-Hudson, New York with her husband, their two children, and two dogs, and is at work on her second novel.

Critical reception
Lives of the Monster Dogs received mostly positive reviews. Critics praised it for its originality, while also noting some of its drawbacks as science fiction. Following the 2017 reissue, Jeff Vandermeer of The Atlantic writes, "20 years later, as it gets a much-deserved reissue, Lives of the Monster Dogs feels undeniably like a classic." Tobias Carroll of Tor.com writes in 2017, "The novel opens with a nearly perfect first line: "In the years since the monster dogs were here with us, in New York, I’ve often been asked to write something about the time I spent with them."" Sharona Lin of Guernica writes in 2020, "It’s a wild and fantastical tale with all the hallmarks of a gothic classic: there’s a mad Prussian scientist, a secretive village, an existential crisis, a pondering of what it truly means to be human."

Awards
 2004 Whiting Award for fiction
 New York Times Notable Book for the year, for Lives of the Monster Dogs
 Orange Prize for Fiction shortlisted, for Lives of the Monster Dogs
 Bram Stoker Award for Best First Novel, for Lives of the Monster Dogs

Works

Novels
 Lives of the Monster Dogs, Farrar, Straus & Giroux, 1997

Short ficiton

References

External links
 Official website
 Profile at The Whiting Foundation

Living people
Swiss emigrants to the United States
New York University alumni
American women novelists
Iowa Writers' Workshop alumni
1967 births
20th-century American novelists
20th-century American women writers
21st-century American women writers